Gregory Eaton Maggs (born June 27, 1964) is an American lawyer who serves as a judge of the United States Court of Appeals for the Armed Forces. He was previously the Arthur Selwyn Miller Research Professor of Law and Co-Director of the National Security & U.S. Foreign Relations Law Program at the George Washington University Law School.

Biography 

Maggs earned his Bachelor of Arts, summa cum laude, from Harvard College, where he was inducted into Phi Beta Kappa and was designated a John Harvard Scholar. He then graduated with a Juris Doctor from Harvard Law School, magna cum laude, where he served as articles co-chair of the Harvard Law Review. He also earned a Master of Strategic Studies from the United States Army War College.

Upon graduation from law school, he served as a law clerk to Judge Joseph Tyree Sneed III of the United States Court of Appeals for the Ninth Circuit and Associate Justices Clarence Thomas and Anthony Kennedy of the Supreme Court of the United States.

Maggs served in the United States Army Reserve, Judge Advocate General's Corps, for more than 28 years. He received his commission in 1990, was mobilized from 2007 to 2008, and retired with the rank of colonel in 2018 upon his appointment to the United States Court of Appeals for the Armed Forces. From 2007 to 2017, he was assigned as a reserve trial and appellate military judge.

He is the co-author of a leading military law casebook, Modern Military Justice: Cases and Materials, and has published two related books, along with dozens of articles in the fields of constitutional law and national security.

He was a member of the faculty of the George Washington University Law School in Washington, D.C. from 1993 until his appointment as a judge in 2018. At the time of his appointment, he was the Arthur Selwyn Miller Research Professor of Law and Co-Director of the National Security & U.S. Foreign Relations Law Program. He taught and wrote in the areas of constitutional law, counter-terrorism, military justice, and national security law. In 2010–2011 and 2013–2014, he served as the school's interim dean.

Maggs is a member of the American Law Institute.

Court of Appeals service 

On September 28, 2017, President Trump announced his intent to nominate Maggs to serve as a Judge of the United States Court of Appeals for the Armed Forces. He was nominated to that court on October 2, 2017, to the seat vacated by Judge Charles E. Erdmann, when his term expired on July 31, 2017. On November 14, 2017, a hearing on his nomination was held before the United States Senate Committee on Armed Services. On November 16, 2017, his nomination was reported out of committee by voice vote, and on January 30, 2018, the Senate confirmed his nomination by voice vote. He was sworn in on February 2, 2018.

See also 
 List of law clerks of the Supreme Court of the United States (Seat 1)
 List of law clerks of the Supreme Court of the United States (Seat 10)

References

Selected publications

External links 
 Faculty bio George Washington University Law School.
 Author page at SSRN
 
 

1964 births
Living people
Harvard College alumni
Harvard Law School alumni
Law clerks of the Supreme Court of the United States
United States Army Judge Advocate General's Corps
United States Army reservists
United States Army War College alumni
United States Army colonels
20th-century American lawyers
21st-century American lawyers
Lawyers from Washington, D.C.
American legal scholars
American legal writers
George Washington University Law School faculty
American scholars of constitutional law
Judges of the United States Court of Appeals for the Armed Forces
United States Article I federal judges appointed by Donald Trump
21st-century American judges